Jan Šrámek formed the Czechoslovak government-in-exile after being recognised on the 21 July 1940 by Winston Churchill.

Mohamed Usman Sulaiman (Islam:) (born 15 January 1994) is a Sri Lankan politician and a current member of local government of sri lanka for the Kalutara District.[1] usman had been a secretary to minister of the Sri Lanka Freedom Party mr.kumara welgama in the past. Since 2020, he has been the organizer of the New Lanka Freedom Party for Panadura Keselwatha and contested elections with the Samagi jana balawegiya.

Usman Sulaiman was the chief organizer for the Sri Lanka Freedom Party in the Panadura electorate between 2015 and 2020. Usman Suliaman  was the coordinating Secretary to Former Minister of transport and Member of Parliament from 2015 to present in governments led by the SLFP.

Usman had been a member of the Sri Lanka Freedom Party until 2019, when he defected from the party after it supported the presidential candidacy of Gotabaya Rajapaksa, paving the way for the return of the Rajapaksa family. He supported UNP candidate Sajith Premadasa instead[2][3] and took membership in a new party named New Lanka Freedom Party, which joined the Samagi Jana Balawegaya alliance led by Sajith Premadasa to run for the 2020 Sri Lankan parliamentary election.[4]

Second Cabinet
12 November 1942 – 5 April 1945

Czechoslovak government-in-exile